Kathryn Pilgrim, known professionally as Kitty Pilgrim, has worked throughout her career as international journalist and author.  She was a CNN anchor and correspondent for 25 years.   She has been active in the world of foreign policy, covering many international issues.  She is currently a lifetime member of the Council on Foreign Relations and is a distinguished fellow at the EastWest Institute, (EWI) an NGO that serves to reduce international conflict.

In her free time she writes international romantic thrillers, and mysteries, based on science and exploration.  Her novels The Explorer's Code. and The Stolen Chalice, were published by Scribner.  Her third novel "Summer of Fire" came out in 2014.

Biography 
Pilgrim graduated from Manhattanville College in Purchase, New York, in 1976 with a degree in political science. She studied Russian, which ultimately led to her career in journalism. She delivered the commencement speech for the Class of 2012, earning an honorary Doctor of Humane Letters from Manhattanville College.

She has a master's from the School of International and Public Affairs (SIPA) at Columbia University. She attended the Harriman Institute for Advanced Study of the Soviet Union. Many of her academic fellowships involved security issues in various regions of the world.  She was a fellow at the Salzburg Global Seminar in Salzburg, Austria, for Asian Pacific security,  a fellow at the East–West Center in Honolulu, Hawaii, for Asian economic and security issues, and a Hong Kong journalism fellow and a fellow in the East–West Center's Korean Journalism exchange.

She is interested in science and exploration and is a fellow in the Royal Geographical Society in London, and a full member of the Explorer's Club of New York City.  .

Journalist
Pilgrim worked as New York-based anchor and correspondent for CNN for 25 years. Her travels have taken her on special assignments to Russia, Cuba, China, Japan, South Korea, Europe, and parts of Africa. In domestic reporting she covered economics, politics, and a range of other topics. She was part of the CNN team that broadcast continuously in New York during the September 11 attacks and in the weeks thereafter.

Kitty Pilgrim was a New York City-based news anchor and correspondent for CNN beginning with CNN in 1986 as a production assistant, and was named correspondent shortly thereafter. She anchored her own broadcast, Early Edition, in 1998 and 1999 and served as an anchor for CNN, CNNI, CNNfn, and Headline News for more than a decade. Starting in 2001, she was prime-time back-up anchor for the 7PM hour on CNN. 

She also served as a correspondent for CNN's Southeast Bureau and was the lead correspondent in CNN's coverage of the Birmingham, Alabama anti-abortion violence in 1998 and the subsequent hunt for suspect Eric Rudolph. She was also part of the CNN Moneyline team that won an Overseas Press Club Award for its live broadcasts from Havana, Cuba, in 1995. Pilgrim has won  an Emmy, Peabody and the New York Society of Black Journalists Award for field reporting on social and economic issues in South Africa.

Author
Using her reporting skills and knowledge of international affairs, Pilgrim has written romantic thrillers with an international flavor, featuring an archaeologist John Sinclair, and a female oceanographer, Cordelia Stapleton.   The Explorer's Code is the first in the series, published by Scribner in 2011. Her novels are "fact-based fiction"—certain events and locations are true to life. Her thrillers are characterized by their diverse locations and "around the world" approach. According to WorldCat, the book is held in  588 libraries.

In 2010 she signed a two-book deal with New York publisher Charles Scribner's Sons. Her debut novel, The Explorer's Code, was quickly followed by a sequel "the Stolen Chalice". The book is held in 421 libraries. A third novel based on the same characters. "Summer of Fire" was published by River Grove. The book is held in 65  libraries.

References

External links
 www.kittypilgrim.com

Living people
School of International and Public Affairs, Columbia University alumni
Writers from Poughkeepsie, New York
1954 births
American broadcast news analysts
Manhattanville College alumni
CNN people
Journalists from New York (state)